Thamira (1967/1968 – 27 April 2021) was an Indian writer, film director and producer active in Tamil cinema.

Life
He began his career by assisting filmmakers K. Balachander and Bharathiraja. He made his directorial debut in 2010 with Rettaisuzhi, and cast both his mentors in the film in important roles.

Thamira's second movie was Aan Devathai in 2018, that starred Samuthirakani, Ramya Pandian, Kavin, and Monica. His next project was the web series My Perfect Husband, featuring Sathyaraj and Seetha, that was set to release on Disney+ Hotstar.

Death
Thamira died on 27 April 2021 after suffering from COVID-19 complications at a private hospital in Chennai. He was 53.

Filmography

References

1960s births
2021 deaths
Year of birth uncertain
Indian film directors
Tamil film directors
Film directors from Chennai
Deaths from the COVID-19 pandemic in India